Kunming attack may refer to:

 2008 Kunming bus bombings
 2014 Kunming attack